Bradina aureolalis is a moth in the family Crambidae. It was described by Joseph de Joannis in 1899. It is found on the Seychelles, where it has been recorded from Mahé, Silhouette and Praslin.

References

Moths described in 1899
Bradina